John Thomas (born September 8, 1975) is an American former professional basketball player. He was the captain of the Minnesota Golden Gophers team that advanced to the 1997 NCAA Semi-Final.

Selected by the New York Knicks with the 25th pick in the 1997 NBA Draft although he never played a game with them as he was traded, along with Dontae' Jones, Walter McCarty and Scott Brooks to the Boston Celtics in exchange for Chris Mills and two conditional second-round draft choices on October 22, 1997. Four months later, he was again traded, this time to the Toronto Raptors, alongside Chauncey Billups, Dee Brown and Roy Rogers, for Kenny Anderson, Zan Tabak and Popeye Jones. He signed as a free agent with the Minnesota Timberwolves in October 2004, appearing in 44 games over the course of the entire season. Thomas was claimed off waivers by the Atlanta Hawks in November 2005 from the Memphis Grizzlies and subsequently placed on waivers again on January 5, 2006. To complete the season he appeared in two games with the New Jersey Nets.

He signed with Hapoel Holon in 2009. In 2009–10, he was the top rebounder in the Israel Basketball Premier League.

In January 2011, he signed with Aris B.C. in Greece, but he was released in April 2011. He signed with Jeonju KCC Egis in South Korea the following season.

As of 2014, Thomas was the National Coordinator for Ultimate Hoops, an adult basketball league.  As of 2015 he was their National Manager of Training.

References

External links
NBA.com Profile - John Thomas
Career Stats

1975 births
Living people
21st-century African-American sportspeople
African-American basketball players
American expatriate basketball people in Canada
American expatriate basketball people in China
American expatriate basketball people in the Dominican Republic
American expatriate basketball people in Greece
American expatriate basketball people in Israel
American expatriate basketball people in South Korea
American expatriate basketball people in Spain
American men's basketball players
Atlanta Hawks players
Basketball players from Minneapolis
Boston Celtics players
CB Girona players
Centers (basketball)
Colorado 14ers players
Dakota Wizards (CBA) players
Greek Basket League players
Hapoel Holon players
Hapoel Jerusalem B.C. players
Israeli Basketball Premier League players
Jeonju KCC Egis players
Liga ACB players
Memphis Grizzlies players
Minnesota Golden Gophers men's basketball players
Minnesota Timberwolves players
New Jersey Nets players
New York Knicks draft picks
Roosevelt High School (Minnesota) alumni
Sioux Falls Skyforce (CBA) players
Toronto Raptors players
Xinjiang Flying Tigers players
20th-century African-American sportspeople